A distributed file system is a file system where data is distributed across multiple nodes.

Distributed file system may also refer to:
Shared disk file system, a different approach, also known as cluster file system.
Distributed File System (Microsoft), the Microsoft distributed file system (DFS)
DCE Distributed File System, the distributed file system from The Open Group (and earlier from IBM)
 Distributed data store